Aline Krauter (born 30 December 1999) is a German professional golfer. She won The Women's Amateur Championship in 2020, and the NCAA Division I Women's Golf Championships with Stanford in 2022.

Early life and education
Krauter hails from Stuttgart and was educated at Saddlebrook Prep in Florida.

Amateur career
Krauter won the 2016 German Girls Open and finished third at the 2018 Portuguese Ladies Amateur. She won the 2020 Women's Amateur Championship at West Lancashire Golf Club in England, 1 up, over home player Annabell Fuller. She became only the second German to do so, following Leonie Harm in 2018.

Krauter represented Germany at the 2016 World Junior Girls Championship in Canada and at seven European Team Championships between 2016 and 2022, winning silver at the 2020 European Ladies' Team Championship in Uppsala, Sweden alongside Alexandra Försterling and Paula Schulz-Hanssen.

Krauter accepted a golf scholarship to Stanford University and played with the Stanford Cardinal women's golf team between 2018 and 2022, and was a four-time All-American. In 2020, her fall semester of college golf was canceled due to the COVID-19 pandemic. While other conferences forged on, the Pac-12 Conference did not compete. Krauter was in the original 2020 Arnold Palmer Cup team announced in March 2020, but was dropped when the new lineups were presented for the postponed event in December.

As the reigning Women's Amateur champion, Krauter was invited to both the 2021 Augusta National Women's Amateur and the 2021 ANA Inspiration. The tournaments were played on the same dates so she chose to play the ANA Inspiration, where she was the only amateur in the field. She finished 3rd in the 2021 U.S. Open Collegiate Invitational.

In 2022, Krauter graduated with a degree in International Relations and received the Dinah Shore Trophy Award. She ended her amateur career a key player on the Stanford team triumphing in the NCAA Division I Women's Golf Championships, and won the Arnold Palmer Cup.

Professional career
Krauter turned professional in August 2022. She made her professional debut in September at the LPGA Tour's Dana Open, where she finished tied 29th.

She earned her 2023 cards for the LPGA Tour and the Ladies European Tour via Q-School.

Amateur wins
2016 German Girls Open
2020 The Womens Amateur Championship

Source:

Team appearances
World Junior Girls Championship (representing Germany): 2016
European Girls' Team Championship (representing Germany): 2016, 2017
European Ladies' Team Championship (representing Germany): 2018, 2019, 2020, 2021, 2022
Arnold Palmer Cup (representing the International Team): 2022 (winners)

Source:

References

External links

German female golfers
LPGA Tour golfers
Ladies European Tour golfers
Stanford Cardinal women's golfers
Winners of ladies' major amateur golf championships
Sportspeople from Stuttgart
1999 births
Living people
21st-century German women